CKYM-FM is the call sign of a radio station located in Napanee, Ontario on the FM band at 88.7 MHz. Owned by My Broadcasting Corporation, the station airs an adult contemporary format branded as 88.7 myFM, serving the Kingston radio market.

The station was licensed by the Canadian Radio-television and Telecommunications Commission in 2006, and launched in August 2007.

References

External links
88.7 myFM
 

Kym
Kym
Radio stations established in 2007
2007 establishments in Ontario
KYM